Nicole Perrot (born 26 December 1983) is a Chilean professional golfer. She is the first Chilean-born player to win on the LPGA Tour

Perrot was born in Viña del Mar, Chile. She won the 2001 U.S. Girls' Junior and was runner-up at the U.S. Women's Amateur that same year. She turned professional the following year. She started her professional career on the LPGA's second tier Futures Tour. In 2004, she won two events on that tour and qualified to play on the main LPGA Tour in 2005 by finishing third on the money list. She won her first LPGA Tour event at the 2005 Longs Drugs Challenge.

In 2006 her best finish was a tie for 19th at the Fields Open in Hawaii. Hampered by a back injury in 2007, she played only eight events between February and early June.

Professional wins (3)

LPGA Tour (1)

Futures Tour (2)
2002 (2) The Albany FUTURES Golf Classic, GMAC FUTURES Golf Classic

Results in LPGA majors

CUT = missed the half-way cut
WD = withdrew
"T" = tied

External links

Chilean female golfers
LPGA Tour golfers
Chilean people of French descent
Sportspeople from Viña del Mar
Sportspeople from Santiago
1983 births
Living people